William Muir (17 January 1876 – 18 October 1941) was a Scottish footballer who played as a goalkeeper for Third Lanark, Kilmarnock, Everton, Dundee, Bradford City, Heart of Midlothian, Dundee Hibernian, Dumbarton and Scotland.

References

External links

London Hearts profile (Scotland)
London Hearts profile (Scottish League)

1876 births
1941 deaths
Association football goalkeepers
Scottish footballers
Footballers from South Lanarkshire
Scotland international footballers
Third Lanark A.C. players
Kilmarnock F.C. players
Everton F.C. players
Dundee F.C. players
Dundee United F.C. players
Bradford City A.F.C. players
Heart of Midlothian F.C. players
Dumbarton F.C. players
Scottish Football League players
Scottish Football League representative players
Glenbuck Cherrypickers F.C. players
Scottish Junior Football Association players
Scotland junior international footballers
English Football League players